HRT 4 (HTV 4, "Četvrti program") is a Croatian free-to-air television channel from Hrvatska Radiotelevizija, which was launched on 24 December 2012. Its programming is centred towards newscasts.

Programming
 Dnevnik HRT
 Regionalni dnevnik
 County panorama (Županijska panorama- a few regionalised versions are on air simultaneously)
 Trg Sv. Mark 6
 Live session transmissions of Croatian Parliament
 Soapbox
 Blue and green
 The voice of a man
 Look over the border - Croats in BiH
 Eurovijesti
 Business
 Infokanal
 Eurointervju
 Videoblog
 News
 No comment
 Alpe Adria Danube
 DW
 Minority mosaic
 News in English
 Nachrichten (News in German)
 DJH-reports
 Documentary Reportage
 Binoculars
 The fruits of the earth
 From the archives IP

Sports 
 UEFA Europa League
 UEFA Europa Conference League

Logo

External links
Official website 

Television channels in Croatia
Television channels in North Macedonia
Television channels and stations established in 2012
Croatian-language television stations
Legislature broadcasters